Talajim (also Romanized as Talājīm) is a village in Poshtkuh Rural District, Shahmirzad District, Mehdishahr County, Semnan Province, Iran. At the 2006 census, its population was 16, in 7 families.

References 

Populated places in Mehdishahr County